Britannica International School, Budapest was founded in 1994 and is the longest established British School in Hungary. The educational programme is based on the National Curriculum for England suitably enhanced to reflect the school’s truly international nature. The school located in District XII in the Buda Hills has a diverse student population with 46 nationalities between the ages of 5-18.

Leadership

The Principal of the school is the experienced Neil McGarry who has been a school leader in the UK in Northallerton and Germany King's School, Gutersloh. He joins the school following a successful leadership position in La Mare de Carteret High School, Guernsey
The school is part of the Orbital Education group which is headquartered near Manchester in the UK. Orbital Education has schools in Hungary, Spain, Russia and China.

Facilities

The school has an ICT suite, library, indoor swimming pool, gymnasium, auditorium, dining room, sixth-form study rooms, two Science laboratories, Music room, Art room and outdoor play and sports facilities.

Curriculum

The school delivers an enhanced version of the English National Curriculum preparing pupils for International General Certificate of Education (IGCSE) at 16. In at ages 17 and 18 the AS and A2 Level program is delivered - which gives the possibility for students to specialise.

The school has strong academic results with 53% of students getting A or A* results at iGCSE and 85% between A* to C. The school has previously had students receive the Outstanding Cambridge Learner Award for receiving the highest mark in the world for their chosen subject.

Britannica International School, Budapest is a Cambridge International Examination center.

Extracurricular activities

Britannica International School has a wide range of activities available:

 Students can participate in the Duke of Edinburgh’s International Award which is a journey of personal discovery and adventure for young people.
 A team participates in the World Scholar's Cup is an international team academic tournament with students participating from over 40 countries. The school has hosts one of the qualification rounds. In 2014 the Britannica Team reached the final in Yale.
 The school regularly holds school plays and other community events such as the spring fair or the Budapest Poetry competition 
 Students have the option to participate in one of the scheduled Extra-curricular activities. Regularly offered are: Drama, film-making, football, hockey, volleyball, tennis, art, photography, hiking, craft, cookery and dance as well as a number of academic clubs.

Accreditation

The Britannica International School is a member of:
Council of British International Schools which promotes British International schools of global quality
Council of International Schools which helps support the continuous improvement of international education

References

External links

Britannica International School, Budapest

Budapest
International schools in Hungary
Schools in Budapest
Private schools in Hungary
Cambridge schools in Hungary
Educational institutions established in 1994
1994 establishments in Hungary